Nannopetersius mutambuei is a species of fish in the African tetra family, only found in the Inkisi River upstream of the Sanga dam in the lower Congo River basin, in the Democratic Republic of the Congo.

Etymology
The tetra is named in honor of Prof. Mutambue Shango, the General Academic Secretary, of the École Régionale post-universitaire d’Aménagement et gestion Intégrée des Forêts et territoires Tropicaux in Kinshasa, Democratic Republic of the Congo, who was responsible for collecting many fishes from the Inkisi River basin in 1985 and 1986.

References

Alestidae
Freshwater fish of Africa
Taxa named by Soleil Wamuini Lunkayilakio
Taxa named by Emmanuel J. Vreven
Fish described in 2008